Carrier onboard delivery (COD) is the use of aircraft to ferry personnel, mail, supplies, and high-priority cargo, such as replacement parts, from shore bases to an aircraft carrier at sea. Several types of aircraft, including helicopters, have been used by navies in the COD role. The Grumman C-2 Greyhound has been the United States Navy's primary COD aircraft since the mid-1960s.

History

Early United States Navy (USN) recognition of need for a cargo plane capable of carrier landings resulted in airframe conversion of Grumman TBM-3 Avenger torpedo bombers to unarmed seven-passenger COD aircraft designated TBM-3R. Replacement of TBM-3Rs began in the late 1950s. Grumman built a cargo variant of its twin-piston-engined Grumman S-2 Tracker anti-submarine warfare bomber as the C-1A Trader. (Contrary to popular belief, C-130 Hercules was not tested for COD.) In the late 1960s Grumman began production of a cargo variant of its twin-turboprop E-2 Hawkeye Airborne Early Warning aircraft known as the C-2A Greyhound. Five Lockheed US-3A Viking aircraft were also used from the early 1980s to the mid-1990s. The C-2 has remained the U.S. Navy's primary COD vehicle since that time.

Several U.S. Navy "Fleet Logistics Support Squadrons" provided COD services aboard carriers since the World War II, including VR-5, VR-21, VR-22, VR-23, VR-24, VRC-30, VRC-40, and VRC-50.

This operation was part of an evaluation of the feasibility of the MV-22 as a potential replacement for the current C-2 cargo transport aircraft.

In April 2014 Lockheed Martin announced that they would offer refurbished and remanufactured Lockheed S-3 Vikings as a replacement for the decades-old Northrop Grumman C-2A Greyhound on-board carrier delivery aircraft.  Dubbed the C-3, the aircraft would have a wider fuselage, but would retain the original wings, tail assembly, engines and crew compartment. With an unrefueled range of  carrying a  load, Lockheed stated that the C-3 would have twice the range of a new C-2, and triple the range of a V-22 Osprey. Unlike other competitors, the C-3 could meet the critical requirement to transport replacement Pratt & Whitney jet engines for the F-35. The requirement for 35 aircraft would be met from the 91 S-3s currently in storage. In 2015, the Navy published a memorandum of understanding (MoU) for using 4 to 12 HV-22s as COD. On 3 February 2016, the future COD version was designated as the CMV-22B.

List of COD aircraft

Several aircraft types have been specifically designed or modified for COD missions:
 Bell Boeing CMV-22B Osprey
 Fairey Gannet COD.4
 Grumman/General Motors TBM-3R Avenger
 Grumman TF/C-1 Trader
 Grumman C-2 Greyhound 
 Lockheed US-3A Viking

See also
 Military logistics
 Seabasing
 Sealift
 Underway replenishment
 Vertical replenishment (VERTREP)

References

External links
 "Carrier Onboard Delivery" By Tommy H. Thomason

Military air transport
Military logistics
Naval aviation